Miss Universe Puerto Rico 2021 was the 65th edition of the Miss Universe Puerto Rico pageant, held on September 30, 2021 at Luis A. Ferré Performing Arts Center in San Juan, Puerto Rico. Estefanía Soto of San Sebastián crowned Michelle Colón of Loíza as her successor at the end of the event.

Colón represented Puerto Rico at the Miss Universe 2021 pageant and finished as Top 10.

Result

Placements

§ – Voted into the Top 6 via the fan vote

Special awards

Delegates 
26 delegates competed for the title of Miss Universe Puerto Rico 2021:

Judges

Preliminary
 Uma Blasini – Miss Puerto Rico Universe 2007 from  Guayanilla
 Danna Hernández – Miss Universe Puerto Rico 2017 from  San Juan
 Katiria Soto – Journalist
 Yamil Ureña – Actor
 Paul Anthony – Hair and makeup artist
 Margarita Álvarez – Fashion designer
 Otilio Santiago – Businessman
 Maximiliano Córdova – Model and banker
 Eileen Ojeda – Walgreens director of operations

Final
 Aleyda Ortiz – Nuestra Belleza Latina 2014
 Ana Rosa Brito – Miss Universe Puerto Rico 1997 from  San Juan
 Anna di Marco – Doctor
 Frances Estrada – Fashion blogger and influencer
 Joyce Giraud – Miss Universe Puerto Rico 1998 from  Aguas Buenas
 Juan Casillas – B Media Group president
 Madison Anderson – Miss Universe Puerto Rico 2019 from  Toa Baja
 Michelle Pérez – Vicepresident of El Vocero
 Viviana Ortiz – Miss Universe Puerto Rico 2011 from  Corozal

Crossovers 
 Miss World Puerto Rico
 2021:  San Germán – Bárbara Betancourt (as  San Juan; 1st Runner-Up)

 Miss USA

 Miss Intercontinental

References

See also

Miss Universe Puerto Rico

2021
2021 beauty pageants
2021 in Puerto Rico